Olvídame may refer to:

 "Olvídame", a song by Julión Álvarez, also included in the compilation album Puros Trankazos, 2011
 "Olvídame", a song by Motel from their album Motel, 2006
 "Olvídame", a song by Thalía from her album El Sexto Sentido, 2005